Rio Branco de Andradas Futebol Clube, commonly known as Rio Branco de Andradas, is a Brazilian football club based in Andradas, Minas Gerais state. They competed in the Série B and in the Série C twice.

History
The club was founded on June 13, 1948. They competed in the Série B in 1989, when they were eliminated in the First Stage, 1991, and in the Série C in 1992 and in 2003. Rio Branco de Andradas won the Campeonato Mineiro Módulo II in 1998, and in 2006.

Achievements
 Campeonato Mineiro Módulo II:
 Winners (2): 1998, 2006

Stadium
Rio Branco de Andradas Futebol Clube play their home games at Estádio Parque do Azulão. The stadium has a maximum capacity of 6,000 people.

References

Association football clubs established in 1948
Football clubs in Minas Gerais
1948 establishments in Brazil